Loup-Denis Elion (born 9 September 1979) is a French actor and singer.

Theater

Filmography

References

External links

1979 births
Living people
21st-century French male actors
French male television actors
People from Fontenay-aux-Roses